This article contains information about the literary events and publications of 1952.

Events
February – The historical periodical Past & Present is launched in Oxford, U.K.
February 29 – Derek J. de Solla Price reveals his discovery of a lost medieval scientific work entitled Equatorie of the Planetis, initially attributed to Geoffrey Chaucer, in the Times Literary Supplement.
March 3 – J. L. Carr takes over as Headmaster of Highfields Primary School, Kettering, which will later feature in his novel The Harpole Report.
May – The works of André Gide are placed on the Catholic Church's Index of Forbidden Books by Pope Pius XII.
July 10 – The first issue appears of Mad, edited by Harvey Kurtzman and published by William M. Gaines' EC Comics. 
August 12 – The Night of the Murdered Poets brings the execution of 13 Soviet Jews in Lubyanka Prison, Moscow, including several writers.
September 6 – The Universal Copyright Convention is adopted at Geneva.
October 17 – Samuel Beckett's play Waiting For Godot is published in Paris as En attendant Godot by Les Éditions de Minuit.
October 28 – E. E. Cummings delivers the first of his Charles Eliot Norton lectures at Harvard University.
November 25 – Agatha Christie's play The Mousetrap opens at the New Ambassadors Theatre, London. It will still be running as of 2021, next door at St Martin's Theatre from 1974.
unknown dates
The publisher Diogenes Verlag is founded in Zurich, Switzerland, by Daniel Keel.
The National Library of Burma is established in Rangoon.

New books

Fiction
Thomas Armstrong – Adam Brunskill
Isaac Asimov
The Currents of Space
Foundation and Empire
H. E. Bates – Love for Lydia
 Margot Bennett – The Widow of Bath
John Bingham – My Name Is Michael Sibley
Pearl S. Buck – The Hidden Flower
John Bude – Death on the Riviera
Ivan Bunin – The Life of Arseniev
Italo Calvino
The Argentine Ant (La Formica Argentina)
The Cloven Viscount (l visconte dimezzato, first of the Our Ancestors trilogy)
Victor Canning – The House of the Seven Flies
John Dickson Carr
The Nine Wrong Answers
Behind the Crimson Blind (as Carter Dickson)
 Henry Cecil – No Bail for the Judge
Louis-Ferdinand Céline – Fable for Another Time
Agatha Christie
Mrs McGinty's Dead
They Do It with Mirrors
A Daughter's a Daughter (as Mary Westmacott)
Brian Cleeve – The Far Hills
Branko Ćopić – Prolom (The Break-out)
Thomas B. Costain – The Silver Chalice
A. J. Cronin – Adventures in Two Worlds
August Derleth
Three Problems for Solar Pons
Night's Yawning Peal: A Ghostly Company (as editor)
David F. Dodge – To Catch a Thief
Jean Dutourd – The Best Butter
Ralph Ellison – Invisible Man
Edna Ferber – Giant
C. S. Forester – Lieutenant Hornblower
Paul Gallico – The Small Miracle
Anthony Gilbert – Miss Pinnegar Disappears
Jean Giono – The Malediction
Richard Gordon – Doctor in the House
Winston Graham – Fortune Is a Woman
 Walter Greenwood – So Brief the Spring
Edward Grierson – Reputation for a Song
Vasily Grossman – Stalingrad («Сталингра́д»)
Han Suyin – A Many-Splendoured Thing
Robert A. Heinlein – The Rolling Stones
Ernest Hemingway – The Old Man and the Sea
Willem Frederik Hermans –  (The House of Refuge or An Untouched House, novella)
Patricia Highsmith – The Price of Salt (as Claire Morgan)
Hammond Innes – Campbell's Kingdom
Michael Innes – A Private View
Ernst Jünger – Visit to Godenholm
Frances Parkinson Keyes – Steamboat Gothic
David H. Keller – Tales from Underwood
Arthur Koestler – Arrow in the Blue
Halldór Laxness – Gerpla
Doris Lessing – Martha Quest
E. C. R. Lorac 
 Crossed Skis
 The Dog It Was That Died
 Murder in the Mill-Race
Ross Macdonald – The Ivory Grin
Compton Mackenzie – The Rival Monster
Bernard Malamud – The Natural
Wolf Mankowitz – Make Me an Offer
Ana Maria Matute – Fiesta al noroeste
 Gladys Mitchell –  The Echoing Strangers
Harry Mulisch – Archibald Strohalm
C. L. Moore – Judgment Night (science fiction short stories)
R. K. Narayan – The Financial Expert
Flannery O'Connor – Wise Blood
Vin Packer – Spring Fire
Anthony Powell – A Buyer's Market
 Maurice Procter – Rich Is the Treasure
John Pudney – The Net
Barbara Pym – Excellent Women
Ellery Queen – The King is Dead
Lucien Rebatet – Les Deux étendards
Charles Shaw – Heaven Knows, Mr. Allison
John Steinbeck – East of Eden
Rex Stout
Triple Jeopardy
Prisoner's Base
Noel Streatfeild – Aunt Clara
A. C. Swinburne (died 1909) – Lesbia Brandon (completed c.1868)
Edith Templeton – The Island of Desire
Jim Thompson – The Killer Inside Me
Agnes Sligh Turnbull – The Gown of Glory
Amos Tutuola – The Palm-Wine Drunkard
Sachchidananda Vatsyayan (Agyeya) – Nadi ke dweep (Islands in the stream)
Vercors – Les Animaux dénaturés
Arved Viirlaid –  (Graves Without Crosses)
Kurt Vonnegut – Player Piano
Henry Wade – Be Kind to the Killer
Evelyn Waugh – Men at Arms
Hillary Waugh – Last Seen Wearing...
 Vaughan Wilkins – A King Reluctant
Angus Wilson – Hemlock and After
Frank Yerby – The Saracen Blade

Children and young people
Rev. W. Awdry – Toby the Tram Engine (seventh in The Railway Series of 42 books by him and his son Christopher Awdry)
Enid Blyton – Noddy and Big Ears
Bruce Carter – The Perilous Descent (Into a Strange Lost World)
Alice Dalgliesh – The Bears on Hemlock Mountain
Dorothy Edwards – My Naughty Little Sister. Stories from "Listen With Mother"
Rumer Godden – Mouse House
C. S. Lewis – The Voyage of the Dawn Treader
Eloise Jarvis McGraw – Moccasin Trail
Farley Mowat – People of the Deer
Mary Norton – The Borrowers (first in the eponymous series of 6 books)
Rhoda Power – Redcap Runs Away
William Matthew Scott – The Cherrys of River House (first in The Cherrys series of 14 books)
Louis Slobodkin – The Space Ship Under the Apple Tree
Geoffrey Trease – The Crown of Violet (also Web of Traitors)
E. B. White – Charlotte's Web

Drama
Rodney Ackland – The Pink Room
Jean Anouilh
The Lark (L'Alouette)
The Waltz of the Toreadors (La Valse des toréadors)
Jacinto Benavente – 
Alice Childress – Gold Through the Trees
Noël Coward – Quadrille
Constance Cox – Lord Arthur Savile's Crime
Robertson Davies – A Masque of Aesop
Henry de Montherlant – La Ville dont le prince est un enfant (The City Whose Prince is a Child; first performance in first published version)
Friedrich Dürrenmatt – The Marriage of Mr. Mississippi (Die Ehe des Herrn Mississippi, first performance)
Joseph Kramm – The Shrike
Charles Langbridge Morgan – The River Line
Eric Linklater – The Mortimer Touch
Roger MacDougall – Escapade
J. B. Priestley and Jacquetta Hawkes – Dragon's Mouth
Terence Rattigan – The Deep Blue Sea
Dodie Smith – Letter from Paris
Ben Travers – Wild Horses
John Van Druten – I've Got Sixpence
Arthur Watkyn – The Moonraker

Poetry

Paul Celan – Poppy and Memory
David Jones – The Anathemata: fragments of an attempted writing
Gabriela Mistral – Los sonetos de la muerte y otros poemas elegíacos
Sean O Riordain – Eireaball Spideoige

Non-fiction
Roland Bainton – The Reformation of the Sixteenth Century
L. Sprague de Camp and Willy Ley – Lands Beyond
Dorothy Day – The Long Loneliness
Lawrence Gowing – Vermeer
Heinrich Harrer – Sieben Jahre in Tibet. Mein Leben am Hofe des Dalai Lama (Seven Years in Tibet, 1954)
Aldous Huxley
The Devils of Loudun
Tomorrow and Tomorrow and Tomorrow
Maurice Nicoll – Psychological Commentaries on the Teachings of G. I. Gurdjieff and P. D. Ouspensky
Norman Vincent Peale – The Power of Positive Thinking
Gwen Raverat – Period Piece
P. R. Reid – The Colditz Story
Jean-Paul Sartre – Saint Genet, comédien et martyr
Pierre Schaeffer – In Search of a Concrete Music (À la Recherche d'une Musique Concrète)
F. Sherwood Taylor – The Alchemists
Paul Tillich – Courage To Be
Immanuel Velikovsky – Ages in Chaos
J. M. Wallace-Hadrill – The Barbarian West, 400–1000
Raymond Williams – Drama from Ibsen to Eliot

Births
January 4 – Michele Wallace, American feminist author
January 12 – Walter Mosley, American novelist
January 21 – Louis Menand, American author and academic
February 10 – Gail Rebuck, English publisher
February 19
Ryū Murakami (村上 龍), Japanese novelist, essayist and filmmaker
Amy Tan, American novelist
February 29 – Tim Powers, American fantasy author
March 5 – Robin Hobb (Margaret Astrid Lindholm Ogden, Megan Lindholm), American fantasy author
March 7 – William Boyd, Gold Coast-born Scottish novelist and screenwriter
March 11 – Douglas Adams, English science fiction author (died 2001)
March 13 – Ágnes Rapai, Hungarian poet, writer and translator
March 23 – Kim Stanley Robinson, American science fiction author
March 26 – T. A. Barron, American novelist
May 5 – Hafsat Abdulwaheed, Nigerian author and poet
June 4 – Dambudzo Marechera, Zimbabwean writer (died 1987)
June 7 – Orhan Pamuk, Turkish novelist and Nobel laureate
June 20 
Vince Gotera, American poet and critic
Vikram Seth, Indian novelist
June 29 – Breece D'J Pancake (Breece Dexter Pancake), American short story writer (suicide 1979)
July 3 – Rohinton Mistry, Indian-born Canadian novelist
July 6 – Hilary Mantel, English novelist (died 2022)
July 10 – Candice F. Ransom, American children's and young-adult author
July 18 – Per Petterson, Norwegian novelist
August 28 – Rita Dove, American poet
September 29 - Pete Hautman, American young-adult novelist
October 18 – Bảo Ninh, Vietnamese author
November 15 – Rick Atkinson, American journalist, historian and author
November 21 – Pedro Lemebel, Chilean novelist
December 19 – Sean O'Brien, English poet
December 22 – Mick Inkpen, English children's writer and illustrator
December 28 – Hemant Shesh, Indian Hindi writer

Deaths
January 22 – Roger Vitrac, French poet and dramatist (born 1899)
January 26 – Lodewijk van Deyssel, Dutch novelist (born 1864)
February 7 – Norman Douglas, Austrian-born Scottish novelist (born 1868)
February 13 – Josephine Tey (Elizabeth MacKintosh), Scottish crime novelist (born 1896)
February 19 – Knut Hamsun, Norwegian novelist and Nobel laureate (born 1859)
March 1
Mariano Azuela, Mexican novelist, dramatist and critic (born 1873)
Masao Kume (久米 正雄), Japanese playwright, novelist and haiku poet (born 1891)
March 27 – Ioan A. Bassarabescu, Romanian short story writer and politician (born 1870)
April 1 – Ferenc Molnár (Ferenc Neumann), Hungarian dramatist and novelist (born 1878)
May 17 – Paul Bujor, Romanian politician, zoologist and short story writer (born 1862)
May 26 – Eugene Jolas, American/French writer, literary translator and critic (born 1894)
June 1 – John Dewey, American philosopher and psychologist (born 1859)
July 1 – A. S. W. Rosenbach, American book collector (born 1876)
July 8 – August Alle, Estonian writer (born 1890)
August 9 – Jeffery Farnol, English historical novelist (born 1878)
August 22 – H. J. Massingham, English countryside writer (born 1888)
September 26 – George Santayana, Spanish philosopher, poet and novelist writing in English (born 1863)
October 4 – Keith Murdoch, Australian journalist (born 1885)
October 6 – Teffi (Nadezhda Alexandrovna Buchinskaya), Russian humorist (born 1872)
November 3 – Louis Verneuil, French playwright (suicide, born 1893)
November 4 – Gilbert Frankau, English novelist (born 1884)
November 13 – Margaret Wise Brown, American children's author (embolism, born 1910)
November 16 – Charles Maurras, French poet and critic (born 1868)
November 18 – Paul Éluard, French surrealist poet (heart attack, born 1895)
November 23 – Aaro Hellaakoski, Finnish poet (born 1893)
December 6 – Cicely Hamilton, English dramatist and suffragist (born 1872)

Awards
Carnegie Medal for children's literature: Mary Norton, The Borrowers
Frost Medal: Carl Sandburg
James Tait Black Memorial Prize for fiction: Evelyn Waugh, Men at Arms
James Tait Black Memorial Prize for biography: G. M. Young, Stanley Baldwin
National Book Award: James Jones, From Here to Eternity.
Newbery Medal for children's literature: Eleanor Estes, Ginger Pye
Newdigate prize: Donald Hall
Nobel Prize for Literature: François Mauriac
Premio Nadal: María Medio Estrada, Nosotros, los Rivero
Pulitzer Prize for Drama: Joseph Kramm, The Shrike
Pulitzer Prize for Fiction: Herman Wouk – The Caine Mutiny
Pulitzer Prize for Poetry: Marianne Moore, Collected Poems
King's Gold Medal for Poetry: Andrew Young
National Book Award for Fiction: James Jones – From Here to Eternity

References

 
Years of the 20th century in literature